Paganism (from classical Latin pāgānus "rural", "rustic", later "civilian") is a term first used in the fourth century by early Christians for people in the Roman Empire who practiced polytheism, or ethnic religions other than Judaism. In the time of the Roman empire, individuals fell into the pagan class either because they were increasingly rural and provincial relative to the Christian population, or because they were not milites Christi (soldiers of Christ). Alternative terms used in Christian texts were hellene, gentile, and heathen. Ritual sacrifice was an integral part of ancient Graeco-Roman religion and was regarded as an indication of whether a person was pagan or Christian. Paganism has broadly connoted the "religion of the peasantry".

During and after the Middle Ages, the term paganism was applied to any non-Christian religion, and the term presumed a belief in false gods. The origin of the application of the term "pagan" to polytheism is debated. In the 19th century, paganism was adopted as a self-descriptor by members of various artistic groups inspired by the ancient world. In the 20th century, it came to be applied as a self-descriptor by practitioners of modern paganism, modern pagan movements and Polytheistic reconstructionists. Modern pagan traditions often incorporate beliefs or practices, such as nature worship, that are different from those of the largest world religions.

Contemporary knowledge of old pagan religions and beliefs comes from several sources, including anthropological field research records, the evidence of archaeological artifacts, and the historical accounts of ancient writers regarding cultures known to Classical antiquity. Most modern pagan religions existing today express a worldview that is pantheistic, panentheistic, polytheistic, or animistic, but some are monotheistic.

Nomenclature and etymology

Pagan

The term pagan derives from Late Latin , revived during the Renaissance. Itself deriving from classical Latin  which originally meant 'region delimited by markers',  had also come to mean 'of or relating to the countryside', 'country dweller', 'villager'; by extension, 'rustic', 'unlearned', 'yokel', 'bumpkin'; in Roman military jargon, 'non-combatant', 'civilian', 'unskilled soldier'.

Medieval writers often assumed that paganus as a religious term was a result of the conversion patterns during the Christianization of Europe, where people in towns and cities were converted more easily than those in remote regions, where old ways tended to remain. However, this idea has multiple problems. First, the word's usage as a reference to non-Christians pre-dates that period in history. Second, paganism within the Roman Empire centred on cities. The concept of an urban Christianity as opposed to a rural paganism would not have occurred to Romans during Early Christianity. Third, unlike words such as rusticitas, paganus had not yet fully acquired the meanings (of uncultured backwardness) used to explain why it would have been applied to pagans.

Paganus more likely acquired its meaning in Christian nomenclature via Roman military jargon (see above). Early Christians adopted military motifs and saw themselves as Milites Christi (soldiers of Christ). A good example of Christians still using paganus in a military context rather than religious isone  in Tertullian's De Corona Militis XI.V, where the Christian is referred to as paganus (civilian): 

Paganus acquired its religious connotations by the mid-4th century. As early as the 5th century, paganos was metaphorically used to denote persons outside the bounds of the Christian community. Following the sack of Rome by the Visigoths just over fifteen years after the Christian persecution of paganism under Theodosius I, murmurs began to spread that the old gods had taken greater care of the city than the Christian God. In response, Augustine of Hippo wrote De Civitate Dei Contra Paganos ('The City of God against the Pagans'). In it, he contrasted the fallen "city of Man" with the "city of God", of which all Christians were ultimately citizens. Hence, the foreign invaders were "not of the city" or "rural".

The term pagan was not attested in the English language until the 17th century. In addition to infidel and heretic, it was used as one of several pejorative Christian counterparts to goy ( / ) as used in Judaism, and to kafir ('unbeliever') and mushrik ('idolater') as in Islam.

Hellene

In the Latin-speaking Western Roman Empire of the newly Christianizing Roman Empire, Koine Greek became associated with the traditional polytheistic religion of Ancient Greece and was regarded as a foreign language (lingua peregrina) in the west. By the latter half of the 4th century in the Greek-speaking Eastern Empire, pagans were—paradoxically—most commonly called Hellenes (lit. "Greeks") The word had almost entirely ceased being used in a cultural sense. It retained that meaning for roughly the first millennium of Christianity.

This was influenced by Christianity's early members, who were Jewish. The Jews of the time distinguished themselves from foreigners according to religion rather than ethno-cultural standards, and early Jewish Christians would have done the same. Since Hellenic culture was the dominant pagan culture in the Roman east, they referred to pagans as Hellenes. Christianity inherited Jewish terminology for non-Jews and adapted it in order to refer to non-Christians with whom they were in contact. This usage is recorded in the New Testament. In the Pauline epistles, Hellene is almost always juxtaposed with Hebrew regardless of actual ethnicity

The usage of Hellene as a religious term was initially part of an exclusively Christian nomenclature, but some Pagans began to defiantly call themselves Hellenes. Other pagans even preferred the narrow meaning of the word from a broad cultural sphere to a more specific religious grouping. However, there were many Christians and pagans alike who strongly objected to the evolution of the terminology. The influential Archbishop of Constantinople Gregory of Nazianzus, for example, took offence at imperial efforts to suppress Hellenic culture (especially concerning spoken and written Greek) and he openly criticized the emperor.

The growing religious stigmatization of Hellenism had a chilling effect on Hellenic culture by the late 4th century.

By late antiquity, however, it was possible to speak Greek as a primary language while not conceiving of oneself as a Hellene. The long-established use of Greek both in and around the Eastern Roman Empire as a lingua franca ironically allowed it to instead become central in enabling the spread of Christianity—as indicated for example, by the use of Greek for the Epistles of Paul. In the first half of the 5th century, Greek was the standard language in which bishops communicated, and the Acta Conciliorum ("Acts of the Church Councils") were recorded originally in Greek and then translated into other languages.

Heathen
Heathen comes from Old English hæðen (not Christian or Jewish); cf. Old Norse . This meaning for the term originated from Gothic  (gentile woman) being used to translate Hellene in Wulfila's Bible, the first translation of the Bible into a Germanic language. This may have been influenced by the Greek and Latin terminology of the time used for pagans. If so, it may be derived from Gothic  (dwelling on the heath). However, this is not attested. It may even be a borrowing of Greek  via Armenian .

The term has recently been revived in the forms Heathenry and Heathenism (often but not always capitalized), as alternative names for the Germanic neopagan movement, adherents of which may self-identify as Heathens.

Definition

Defining paganism is complex and problematic. Understanding the context of its associated terminology is important. Early Christians referred to the diverse array of cults around them as a single group for reasons of convenience and rhetoric. While paganism generally implies polytheism, the primary distinction between classical pagans and Christians was not one of monotheism versus polytheism, as not all pagans were strictly polytheist. Throughout history, many of them believed in a supreme deity. However, most such pagans believed in a class of subordinate gods/daimons—see henotheism—or divine emanations. To Christians, the most important distinction was whether or not someone worshipped the one true God. Those who did not (polytheist, monotheist, or atheist) were outsiders to the Church and thus considered pagan. Similarly, classical pagans would have found it peculiar to distinguish groups by the number of deities followers venerate. They would have considered the priestly colleges (such as the College of Pontiffs or Epulones) and cult practices more meaningful distinctions.

Referring to paganism as a pre-Christian indigenous religion is equally untenable. Not all historical pagan traditions were pre-Christian or indigenous to their places of worship.

Owing to the history of its nomenclature, paganism traditionally encompasses the collective pre- and non-Christian cultures in and around the classical world; including those of the Greco-Roman, Celtic, Germanic, and Slavic tribes. However, modern parlance of folklorists and contemporary pagans in particular has extended the original four millennia scope used by early Christians to include similar religious traditions stretching far into prehistory.

Perception
Paganism came to be equated by Christians with a sense of hedonism, representing those who are sensual, materialistic, self-indulgent, unconcerned with the future, and uninterested in more mainstream religions. Pagans were usually described in terms of this worldly stereotype, especially among those drawing attention to what they perceived as the limitations of paganism. Thus G. K. Chesterton wrote: "The  set out, with admirable sense, to enjoy himself. By the end of his civilization he had discovered that a man cannot enjoy himself and continue to enjoy anything else." In sharp contrast, Swinburne the poet would comment on this same theme: "Thou hast conquered, O pale Galilean; the world has grown grey from thy breath; We have drunken of things Lethean, and fed on the fullness of death."

Ethnocentrism
Recently, the ethnocentric and moral absolutist origins of the common usage of the term pagan have been proposed, with scholar David Petts noting how, with particular reference to Christianity, "...local religions are defined in opposition to privileged 'world religions'; they become everything that world religions are not, rather than being explored as a subject in their own right." In addition, Petts notes how various spiritual, religious, and metaphysical ideas branded as "pagan" from diverse cultures were studied in opposition to Abrahamism in early anthropology, a binary he links to ethnocentrism and colonialism.

History

Prehistoric
Prehistoric religion
Paleolithic religion

Bronze Age to Early Iron Age
 Religions of the ancient Near East
 Ancient Egyptian religion
 Ancient Semitic religion
 Ancient Iranian religion
 Ancient Mesopotamian religion

Ancient history

Classical antiquity

Ludwig Feuerbach defined the paganism of classical antiquity, which he termed  ('heathenry') as "the unity of religion and politics, of spirit and nature, of god and man", qualified by the observation that man in the pagan view is always defined by ethnicity, i.e., As a result, every pagan tradition is also a national tradition. Modern historians define paganism instead as the aggregate of cult acts, set within a civic rather than a national context, without a written creed or sense of orthodoxy.

Late Antiquity and Christianization

The developments in the religious thought of the far-flung Roman Empire during Late Antiquity need to be addressed separately, because this is the context in which Early Christianity itself developed as one of several monotheistic cults, and it was in this period that the concept of pagan developed in the first place. As Christianity emerged from Second Temple Judaism and Hellenistic Judaism, it stood in competition with other religions advocating pagan monotheism, including the cults of Dionysus, Neoplatonism, Mithraism, Gnosticism, and Manichaeanism. Dionysus in particular exhibits significant parallels with Christ, so that numerous scholars have concluded that the recasting of Jesus the wandering rabbi into the image of Christ the Logos, the divine saviour, reflects the cult of Dionysus directly. They point to the symbolism of wine and the importance it held in the mythology surrounding both Dionysus and Jesus Christ; Wick argues that the use of wine symbolism in the Gospel of John, including the story of the Marriage at Cana at which Jesus turns water into wine, was intended to show Jesus as superior to Dionysus. The scene in The Bacchae wherein Dionysus appears before King Pentheus on charges of claiming divinity is compared to the New Testament scene of Jesus being interrogated by Pontius Pilate.

Postclassical history

Islam in Arabia

Arab paganism gradually disappeared during Muhammad's era through Islamization. The sacred months of the Arab pagans were the 1st, 7th, 11th, and 12th months of the Islamic calendar. After Muhammad had conquered Mecca he set out to convert the pagans. One of the last military campaigns that Muhammad ordered against the Arab pagans was the Demolition of Dhul Khalasa. It occurred in April and May 632 AD, in 10AH of the Islamic Calendar. Dhul Khalasa is referred to as both an idol and a temple, and it was known by some as the Ka'ba of Yemen, built and worshipped by polytheist tribes.

Modern history

Early Modern Renaissance
Interest in pagan traditions was first revived during the Renaissance, when Renaissance magic was practiced as a revival of Greco-Roman magic. In the 17th century, the description of paganism turned from a theological aspect to an ethnological one, and religions began to be understood as part of the ethnic identities of peoples, and the study of the religions of so-called primitive peoples triggered questions as to the ultimate historical origin of religion. Jean Bodin viewed pagan mythology as a distorted version of Christian truths. Nicolas Fabri de Peiresc saw the pagan religions of Africa of his day as relics that were in principle capable of shedding light on the historical paganism of Classical Antiquity.

Late Modern Romanticism

Paganism resurfaces as a topic of fascination in 18th to 19th-century Romanticism, in particular in the context of the literary Celtic, Slavic and Viking revivals, which portrayed historical Celtic, Slavic and Germanic polytheists as noble savages.

The 19th century also saw much scholarly interest in the reconstruction of pagan mythology from folklore or fairy tales. This was notably attempted by the Brothers Grimm, especially Jacob Grimm in his Teutonic Mythology, and Elias Lönnrot with the compilation of the Kalevala. The work of the Brothers Grimm influenced other collectors, both inspiring them to collect tales and leading them to similarly believe that the fairy tales of a country were particularly representative of it, to the neglect of cross-cultural influence. Among those influenced were the Russian Alexander Afanasyev, the Norwegians Peter Christen Asbjørnsen and Jørgen Moe, and the Englishman Joseph Jacobs.

Romanticist interest in non-classical antiquity coincided with the rise of Romantic nationalism and the rise of the nation state in the context of the 1848 revolutions, leading to the creation of national epics and national myths for the various newly formed states. Pagan or folkloric topics were also common in the musical nationalism of the period.

Modern paganism

Modern paganism, or Neopaganism, includes reconstructed religions such as Roman Polytheistic Reconstructionism, Hellenism, Slavic Native Faith, Celtic Reconstructionist Paganism, or heathenry, as well as modern eclectic traditions such as Wicca and its many offshoots, Neo-Druidism, and Discordianism.

However, there often exists a distinction or separation between some polytheistic reconstructionists such as Hellenism and revivalist neopagans like Wiccans. The divide is over numerous issues such as the importance of accurate orthopraxy according to ancient sources available, the use and concept of magic, which calendar to use and which holidays to observe, as well as the use of the term pagan itself.

In 1717 John Toland became the first Chosen Chief of the Ancient Druid Order, which became known as the British Circle of the Universal Bond. Many of the revivals, Wicca and Neo-Druidism in particular, have their roots in 19th century Romanticism and retain noticeable elements of occultism or Theosophy that were current then, setting them apart from historical rural folk religion. Most modern pagans, however, believe in the divine character of the natural world and paganism is often described as an Earth religion.

There are a number of neopagan authors who have examined the relation of the 20th-century movements of polytheistic revival with historical polytheism on one hand and contemporary traditions of folk religion on the other. Isaac Bonewits introduced a terminology to make this distinction.

Neopaganism The overarching contemporary pagan revival movement which focuses on nature-revering/living, pre-Christian religions and/or other nature-based spiritual paths, and frequently incorporating contemporary liberal values. This definition may include groups such as Wicca, Neo-Druidism, Heathenry, and Slavic Native Faith.

 A retronym coined to contrast with Neopaganism, original polytheistic, nature-centered faiths, such as the pre-Hellenistic Greek and pre-imperial Roman religion, pre-Migration period Germanic paganism as described by Tacitus, or Celtic polytheism as described by Julius Caesar.
 A group, which is, or has been, significantly influenced by monotheistic, dualistic, or nontheistic worldviews, but has been able to maintain an independence of religious practices. This group includes aboriginal Americans as well as Aboriginal Australians, Viking Age Norse paganism and New Age spirituality. Influences include: Spiritualism, and the many Afro-Diasporic faiths like Haitian Vodou, Santería and Espiritu religion. Isaac Bonewits includes British Traditional Wicca in this subdivision.

Prudence Jones and Nigel Pennick in their A History of Pagan Europe (1995) classify pagan religions as characterized by the following traits:
 Polytheism: Pagan religions recognise a plurality of divine beings, which may or may not be considered aspects of an underlying unity (the soft and hard polytheism distinction).
 Nature-based: Some pagan religions have a concept of the divinity of nature, which they view as a manifestation of the divine, not as the fallen creation found in dualistic cosmology.
 Sacred feminine: Some pagan religions recognize the female divine principle, identified as the Goddess (as opposed to individual goddesses) beside or in place of the male divine principle as expressed in the Abrahamic God.

In modern times, Heathen and Heathenry are increasingly used to refer to those branches of modern paganism inspired by the pre-Christian religions of the Germanic, Scandinavian and Anglo-Saxon peoples.

In Iceland, the members of Ásatrúarfélagið account for 0.4% of the total population, which is just over a thousand people. In Lithuania, many people practice Romuva, a revived version of the pre-Christian religion of that country. Lithuania was among the last areas of Europe to be Christianized. Odinism has been established on a formal basis in Australia since at least the 1930s.

Ethnic religions of pre-Christian Europe

See also

Notes

References

 
 
 Hua, Yih-Fen. book review to: Maria Effinger / Cornelia Logemann / Ulrich Pfisterer (eds): Götterbilder und Götzendiener in der Frühen Neuzeit. Europas Blick auf fremde Religionen. In: sehepunkte 13 (2013), Nr. 5 [15.05.2013], URL: http://www.sehepunkte.de/2013/05/21410.html. (Book review in English).
 Robert, P. & Scott, N. (1995). A History of Pagan Europe. New York, Barnes & Noble Books, .
 York, Michael (2003). Pagan Theology: Paganism as a World Religion NYU Press, .

External links
 
 

 
Christian terminology
Christianity in late antiquity
Ancient Roman religion